Sheykh Isa (also Romanized as Sheykh Īsá; also known as ‘Alam ol Hodá) is a village in Hoseynabad Rural District, in the Central District of Shush County, Khuzestan Province, Iran. At the 2006 census, its population was 190, in 24 families.

References 

Populated places in Shush County